Lost Boy is the second full-length album by American metalcore band MyChildren MyBride. It was released on June 8, 2010 through Solid State Records. The album was recorded at Glow in the Dark Studios in Atlanta, Georgia and produced by Matt Goldman.

Review
Christian metalcore outfit MyChildren MyBride's sophomore effort rises above its 2008 predecessor with a more adventurous approach to the genre. The basic tenets of the style (toneless screaming and staccato riffs layered over a foundation of tight, dry, double kick drum pedal bursts) are well represented on Lost Boy, but the machine screw production and tone-deaf melodic structures that often accompany those parameters are not. Guitarists Robert Bloomfield and Daniel Alvarado know how to grind out basic jackhammer riffs, but they also know how to take those riffs and bend them into something real, melodic, and surprisingly progressive. Standout cuts like “Hooligans” and “Redeemer” benefit from the old-school punk gang vocals, and producer Matt Goldman (Underoath, the Chariot) allots vocalist Matthew Hasting's voice (which is surprisingly effective and utterly devoid of Cookie Monster posturing) the room it needs to be heard, resulting in another strong outing for both the band and the increasingly “solid” Solid State Records.

Track listing

Credits
MyChildren MyBride
 Matthew Hasting – vocals
 Daniel Alvarado – lead guitar, backing vocals
 Robert Bloomfield – rhythm guitar, backing vocals
 Joe Lengson – bass guitar, backing vocals
Session musicians
 Patrick Snyder - drums
Production
 Produced and engineered by Matt Goldman, at Glow in the Dark Studios, Atlanta, Georgia
 Mixed by Jason Suecof
 Mastered by Troy Glessner, at Spectre Studios, Renton, Washington
 A&R by Brandon Day
 Artwork by Jordan Butcher
 Photography by Jerad Knudson

References

Solid State Records albums
2010 albums
MyChildren MyBride albums